The 2015–16 season was the sixth in the history of Melbourne City Football Club. In addition to the domestic league, the club participated in the FFA Cup for the second time.

Players

Squad information

From youth squad

Transfers in

Transfers out

Technical staff

Statistics

Squad statistics

|-
|colspan="19"|Players no longer at the club:

Pre-season and friendlies

Competitions

Overall

A-League

League table

Results summary

Results by round

Matches
Source: Melbourne City FC 2015–16 season fixtures

Finals series

FFA Cup

References

External links
 Official Website

Melbourne City
Melbourne City FC seasons